Shasheendra Kumara Rajapaksa (known as Shasheendra Rajapaksa) is a Sri Lankan politician. He is a Member of Sri Lankan Parliament for Monaragala District and former State Minister of Paddy and Cereals, Organic Food, Vegetables, Fruits, Chilies, Onions and Potatoes, Seed Production and High Tech Agriculture. 

He was a Provincial Councillor of Uva Province who was Chief Minister of Uva Province in Sri Lanka from 2009 to 2015, and former  Basnayake Nilame (Lay Custodian) of the Ruhunu Maha Kataragama devalaya. He is the eldest son of Chamal Rajapaksa and nephew of former Presidents Mahinda Rajapaksa and Gotabaya Rajapaksa.
Rajapaksa lost his position as Chief Minister of Uva Province to UNP leader Badulla Harin Fernando in 2015, when 6 UPFA members joined Fernando.

See also
 List of political families in Sri Lanka
 List of St. Thomas' College alumni

References

External links
 
 

Living people
1976 births
Alumni of S. Thomas' College, Mount Lavinia
Chief Ministers of Uva Province
Members of the 16th Parliament of Sri Lanka
Members of the Uva Provincial Council
Shasheendra
Sinhalese politicians
Sri Lankan Buddhists